The 1966 Campeonato Ecuatoriano de Fútbol was the 8th national championship for football teams in Ecuador. Barcelona  won their third national title. They qualified to the 1967 Copa Libertadores along with Emelec.

Qualified teams
The number of teams expanded to sixteen. The qualified teams included the top-eight finishers from the Campeonato Interandino and the Campeonato de Guayaquil.

First stage

Sierra

Group A

Standings

Results

Group B

Standings

Results

Costa

Group A

Standings

Results

Group B

Standings

Results

Final stage

Standings

References

Ecuadorian Serie A seasons
1966 in Ecuadorian sport
Ecuador